DreamWorks Dragons: Rescue Riders is an American computer animated television series in the How to Train Your Dragon franchise produced by DreamWorks Animation Television for Netflix. The show premiered on September 27, 2019, and its second season was released on February 7, 2020. Three specials were released in March, July and November 2020.

On November 24, 2021, the series moved to Peacock, with a new season titled Heroes of the Sky. Season Five was released on Peacock on May 19, 2022. The sixth and final season was released on Peacock on September 29, 2022.

Premise
The series follows Dak and Leyla, human twins raised by dragons who have developed, as a result, a unique ability to directly communicate with them, helping and rescuing dragons and the people of the town Huttsgalor.

Cast

Main human cast
 Nicolas Cantu as Dak
 Brennley Brown as Leyla
 Carlos Alazraqui as Duggard
 Moira Quirk as Hannahr

Dragons
 Zach Callison as Winger, a male Swiftwing dragon
 Skai Jackson as Summer, a female Fastfin dragon 
 Noah Bentley as Burple, a male  Rockspitter dragon
 Marsai Martin as Aggro, a female FireFury dragon
 Andre Robinson as Cutter, a male Relentless Razorwing dragon

Recurring cast
 John C. McGinley as Grumblegard, a male grumpy Foreverhorn dragon
 Secunda Wood as Mama Ironclaw, a female Silver-tailed Ironclaw dragon
 Grey Griffin as Marena, Mrs. Borgomon, and Gemma, a female Golden Dragon
 Sam Lavagnino as Finngard Braun Borgomon
 Roshon Fegan as Elbone
 Donald Faison as Albone
 Patton Oswalt as Oscar, a male Flyhopper dragon
 Brian Posehn as Gludge, a male Sea Gronckle dragon
 Alejandro Edda as Cindel, a male Leopardwing dragon
 Ashley Bornancin as Laburn, a female Fire Fury
 Brett Pels as Cindarnanopusflickerstaff, also called Cinda, a female Fire Fury
 Cassidy Naber as Zeppla, a female Puffertail dragon
 Brad Grusnick as Gill, a male Divewing dragon
 Sumalee Montano as Fathom, a female Divewing
 Renée Elise Goldsberry as Melodia, a female Songwing dragon
 Brett Pels as Cantata, a female Songwing
 Roger Craig Smith as Chillbert, a male Chillblaster dragon, and Raf a Ramblefang dragon
 Susanne Blakeslee as Chief Ingrid
 Carlos Alazraqui as Svengard
 Tara Strong as Sparkle, a female Relentless Rainbow Horn
 Charlie Saxton as Whiffy, a male Stinkwing
 Claire Corlett as Blazo, a female Zoomerang
 Zach Callison as Dart, a male Zoomerang
 Nicolas Cantu as Streak, a male Zoomerang
 Max Mittelman as Bubbly, a Bubblegil dragon
 Griffin Burns as Bobbly, a Bubblegil dragon
 Patrick Warburton as Talon, a Chaperange dragon
 Nathan Arenas as Splish, a Shocktail dragon
 Danny Pudi as Numo a Memorazo Dragon

Antagonists
 Brad Grusnick as Magnus Finke
 Jacob Hopkins as Axel Finke, Magnus's nephew
 Carlos Alazraqui as Lurke/Phantom Fang (a male Slinkwing dragon) and Waldondo del Mundo
 Tara Strong as Vizza, a female  Slinkwing
 Jeff Bennett as Snoop, a male Slinkwing, and Erik the Wretched
 Mary Elizabeth McGlynn as Svetlana the Sly
 Maurice LaMarche as Arno the "Carnival of Dragons" Ringmaster
 Sam Riegel as Gorsh a Copycat Dragon

Series overview

Netflix episodes

Season 1 (2019)

Season 2 (2020)

Specials (2020)

Peacock episodes 
Peacock reset the season count after the series moved from Netflix, so the first season on Peacock is actually the third season released for DreamWorks Dragons: Rescue Riders, through to its sixth and final released season (labelled the fourth season on Peacock).

Season 1 (2021)

Season 2 (2022)

Season 3 (2022)

Season 4 (2022)

Production
The series was first announced on July 22, 2019, alongside fellow DreamWorks Animation Television series Go, Dog. Go!, with T.J. Sullivan directing, Jack Thomas executive producing and Brian K. Roberts as co-executive producer.

Release
The series was released on September 27, 2019, on Netflix.

References

External links

2010s American animated television series
2019 American television series debuts
2022 American television series endings
2020s American animated television series
American animated television spin-offs
American children's animated adventure television series
American children's animated comedy television series
American children's animated fantasy television series
American computer-animated television series
Animated television series about children
Animated television series about dragons
Animated television shows based on films
English-language Netflix original programming
How to Train Your Dragon
Netflix children's programming
Peacock (streaming service) children's programming
Peacock (streaming service) original programming
Television series by DreamWorks Animation
Television series by Universal Television